Joe Kyong-fan (also Jo Gyeong-Hwan, ; born May 11, 1982) is a South Korean former swimmer, who specialized in breaststroke events. Joe competed in a breaststroke double at the 2000 Summer Olympics in Sydney. He achieved FINA B-standards of 1:05.00 (100 m breaststroke) and 2:20.20 (200 m breaststroke) from the Dong-A Swimming Tournament in Ulsan. In the 100 m breaststroke, held on the first day of the Games, Joe challenged seven other swimmers in heat four, including two-time Olympians Valērijs Kalmikovs of Latvia and Arsenio López of Puerto Rico. He earned a fifth spot and forty-fifth overall by almost seven-tenths of a second (0.70) behind joint winners Kalmikovs and Lopez in 1:04.71, worthy enough for a personal best. Three days later, in the 200 m breaststroke, Joe placed twenty-ninth on the morning prelims. He set a new South Korean record of 2:19.16 to overhaul a 2:20 barrier and to touch the wall first in heat three.

References

1982 births
Living people
South Korean male breaststroke swimmers
Olympic swimmers of South Korea
Swimmers at the 2000 Summer Olympics
Swimmers from Seoul
21st-century South Korean people